Twin Beds may refer to:

Twin Beds (novel), a 1913 novel by Edward Salisbury Field
Twin Beds (1914 play), based on the novel
Twin Beds (1920 film), based on the novel
Twin Beds (1929 film), based on the novel
Twin Beds (1942 film), based on the novel
Twin Beds (How I Met Your Mother), a 2010 How I Met Your Mother episode